The Great Wall Safe ( or ) is a sport utility vehicle (SUV) produced by the Chinese manufacturer Great Wall Motors from 2002 to 2009.

Overview
The Great Wall Safe has been available in a four-wheel-drive and a rear-wheel-drive configuration.

It has a strong resemblance to the second generation Toyota 4Runner, on the platform of which it is considered to be built. Just like the Great Wall Deer which is the pickup version of the Great Wall Safe, it is said to have been successful in China at the date of its launch, due to its low price.

References

External links
Official website

Safe
Mid-size sport utility vehicles
Cars of China